Public School Number Two is located in Paterson, Passaic County, New Jersey, United States. The building was added to the National Register of Historic Places on March 8, 1978.

See also
National Register of Historic Places listings in Passaic County, New Jersey

References

School buildings on the National Register of Historic Places in New Jersey
Gothic Revival architecture in New Jersey
School buildings completed in 1871
Schools in Passaic County, New Jersey
Defunct schools in New Jersey
National Register of Historic Places in Passaic County, New Jersey
New Jersey Register of Historic Places
Buildings and structures in Paterson, New Jersey
1871 establishments in New Jersey